Michael Morris may refer to:

Arts 
Michael Morris (artist) (born 1942), British-born Canadian visual artist
Michael Morris (director) (born 1974), American television director and producer
Michael Morris (screenwriter) (1918–2003), Ukraine born American television and film screenwriter
MickDeth (Mick Richard Morris, 1978–2013), American musician

Politics 
Michael Morris, Baron Morris (1826–1901), Irish lawyer and political figure, became the first Lord Killanin in 1900
Michael Morris, 3rd Baron Killanin (1914–1999), Irish former head of the International Olympic Committee
Michael Morris, Baron Naseby (born 1936), British Conservative politician, Deputy Speaker of the House of Commons 1992–1997

Science and industry
Michael G. Morris (born 1947), president, chief executive officer, and chairman of American Electric Power
G. Michael Morris, scientist, past president of the Optical Society of America
Michael Morris (oceanographer), scientist and entrepreneur, founder of Ocean Optics, Inc.

Sports
Mick Morris (footballer, born 1943) (1943–2020), English footballer
Mick Morris (Australian footballer) (1882–1959), Australian rules footballer
Mick Morris (Gaelic footballer) (born 1943), Irish former sportsperson
Mouse Morris (Michael Morris, born 1951), Irish racehorse trainer
Michael Armstrong (boxer) (born 1968), British boxer, born Michael Morris

See also
Mike Morris (disambiguation)